Ukhul is a rural locality (a selo) in Akhtynsky District, Republic of Dagestan, Russia. The population was 706 as of 2010.

Geography 
Ukhul is located 17 km south of Akhty (the district's administrative centre) by road, on the Muglakhchay River. Kurukal is the nearest rural locality.

References 

Rural localities in Akhtynsky District